The following is a list of Sri Lankans by diaspora.



A
 List of Sri Lankan Americans
 List of Sri Lankan Australians

B
 List of Sri Lankan Bahamians
 List of Sri Lankan Britons

C
 List of Sri Lankan Canadians

D
 List of Sri Lankan Dutch

F
 List of Sri Lankan French

G
 List of Sri Lankan Germans

I
 List of Sri Lankan Icelanders
 List of Sri Lankan Indians
 List of Sri Lankan Irish
 List of Sri Lankan Italians

J
 List of Sri Lankan Japanese

M
 List of Sri Lankan Malaysians

N
 List of Sri Lankan New Zealanders
 List of Sri Lankan Norwegians

P
 List of Sri Lankan Pakistanis

S
 List of Sri Lankan Scots
 List of Sri Lankan Seychellois
 List of Sri Lankan Sierra Leoneans
 List of Sri Lankan Singaporeans

U
 List of Sri Lankan United Arab Emiratis

See also
Sri Lankan diaspora
Sri Lankan Tamil diaspora
List of Sri Lanka Tamils

Sri Lankan diaspora
Lists